The Superior Court of California, County of Alpine, also known as the Alpine County Superior Court, is the branch of the California superior court with jurisdiction over Alpine County. Alpine is the smallest county in California by population.

History
Alpine County was formed in 1864 following the Comstock Lode discovery, partitioned from neighboring Amador, El Dorado, Calaveras, Mono, and Tuolumne counties.

At the time of the county's formation, Silver Mountain City was the county seat and most populated town, but the mines were shuttered and Silver Mountain City was abandoned soon after Congress demonetized silver in 1873. The county seat was moved to Markleeville in 1874. Court was held in the Markleeville Odd Fellows Hall starting in 1875, with prisoners held in the Old Log Jail.

The current Alpine County Courthouse was originally completed in 1928 to serve as the firehouse and one-engine garage. It was designed by Frederick J. DeLongchamps and built from locally quarried rhyolite tuff blocks in the Romanesque Revival style. Although the original plans called for a two-story structure, cost considerations limited the implementation to one story; residents had passed an  bond issue in 1927 to fund construction. The 1928 courthouse was added to the National Register of Historic Places in 2004.

Funding was authorized for a new Alpine County Courthouse in 2008 via California Senate Bill 1407, but plans were canceled in December 2011.

References

External links
 

Superior Court
Superior courts in California